A super cup is a competition, usually but not exclusively in association football, which often forms the 'curtain raiser' to a season, and typically involves only two teams who have qualified through success in other competitions during the previous season. 

It is typically contested on a national level by two competition winners of the previous season: the national knock-out cup winner and the highest level league champion. There are also continental super cups, like the UEFA Super Cup in football, which puts together winners of the top and second-tier UEFA competitions and the Recopa Sudamericana between CONMEBOL Libertadores and the Sudamericana winners, and cross-border super cups between champions of neighbouring leagues, such as the Campeones Cup between the winners of the highest level leagues in the United States and Mexico, and the Champions Cup for the champions of both Northern Ireland and the Republic of Ireland. 

The now-defunct Intercontinental Cup was a super cup played between the continental champions of Europe and South America, with winners recognised as World Champions prior to the creation of the official FIFA Club World Cup and the CONMEBOL-UEFA Cup of Champions between the winners of the UEFA Euros and the Copa América which rebranded once again in 2022 after the 29-year hiatus.

Sometimes these are two-legged ties, with a match played at each side's stadium, but increasingly they are one-off fixtures at a neutral venue, such as a national stadium. Some Super Cups have even been staged in venues outside their home country, such as the Italian, French, Spanish, Turkish, Mexican, and Egyptian games and increasingly function as publicity events for that league in the global market. 

If the league champions are also the national cup winners, they may play a selected XI team, or more commonly the runners-up from one of the competitions, typically from the league.

Football

National super cups

The following nations have an active super cup competition:

AFC
  Bahraini Super Cup
  Brunei Super Cup
  CNCC Charity Cup
  Chinese FA Super Cup
  Hong Kong Community Cup
  Iranian Super Cup
  Iraqi Super Cup
  Japanese Super Cup
  Jordan Super Cup
  Kyrgyzstan Super Cup
  Kuwait Super Cup
  Lebanese Super Cup
  Sultan Haji Ahmad Shah Cup
  Maldivian FA Charity Shield
  Mongolia Super Cup
  MFF Charity Cup
  Oman Super Cup
  Gaza Strip Super Cup, West Bank Super Cup
  Qatari Sheikh Jassim Cup, Qatar Cup
  Saudi Super Cup
  Singapore Charity Shield
  Syrian Super Cup
  Tajik Supercup
  Thailand Champions Cup
  LFA Super Taça
  Turkmenistan Super Cup
  Uzbekistan Super Cup
  UAE Super Cup
  Vietnamese Super Cup
  Yemeni Super Cup

CAF
  Algerian Super Cup
  Coupe Houphouët-Boigny
  Djibouti Super Cup
  Egyptian Super Cup
 Ghana Super Cup
  Kenyan Super Cup 
  Libyan Super Cup
  Mauritanian Super Cup
  Namibia Super Cup
  Super Coupe du Congo
  Senegalese Super Cup
  Somalia Super Cup
 Tanzania Community Shield
  Tunisian Super Cup

CONCACAF
  Supercopa de Costa Rica
  Salvadoran Supercup
  Copa Campeón de Campeones
  Honduran Supercup
  Campeón de Campeones
  Suriname President's Cup
  Trinidad and Tobago Charity Shield

CONMEBOL
  Supercopa Argentina
  Supercopa do Brasil
  Recopa Catarinense
  Recopa Gaúcha
  Supercopa de Chile
  Superliga Colombiana
  Supercopa Ecuador
  Supercopa Paraguay
  Supercopa Peruana
  Supercopa Uruguaya

OFC
  Champion versus Champion
  Charity Cup
  Tahiti Coupe des Champions

UEFA
  Albanian Supercup
  Andorran Supercup
  Armenian Supercup
  Belarusian Super Cup
  Belgian Supercup
  Bulgarian Supercup
  Croatian Supercup
  Cypriot Super Cup
  FA Community Shield (formerly the Charity Shield)
  Estonian SuperCup
  Faroe Islands Super Cup
  Trophée des Champions
  Georgian Super Cup
  DFL-Supercup
  Pepe Reyes Cup
  Icelandic Super Cup
  Israel Super Cup - Champion of Champions
  Supercoppa Italiana
  Kazakhstan Super Cup
  Kosovar Supercup
  Lithuanian Supercup
  Maltese Super Cup
  Moldovan Super Cup
  Johan Cruyff Shield
  Mesterfinalen
  Polish SuperCup
  Supertaça Cândido de Oliveira
  President's Cup
  Romanian Super Cup
  Russian Super Cup
  Super Coppa Sammarinese
  Supercopa de España
  Turkish Super Cup
  Ukrainian Super Cup

Defunct super cups
  Trofeo de Campeones
  Austrian Supercup
  Azerbaijan Supercup
  Bangladesh Super Cup
  Supercup of Bosnia and Herzegovina
  Super Coupe Roger Milla
  Czech Supercup
  Danish Supercup
  Supercoupe du Gabon
  DFV-Supercup
  Greek Super Cup
  Szuperkupa
  Indian Super Cup
  Indonesian Community Shield
  Latvian Supercup
  Supercopa MX
  Moroccan Super Cup
  NIFL Charity Shield
  Top Four Cup
  Macedonian Super Cup
  Copa Federación
  Slovak Super Cup
  Slovenian Supercup
  Korean Super Cup
  Swiss Super Cup
  Supercupen
  Thai Super Cup (Top 4 places in last season, 2009 only)
  Kor Royal Cup
  Sheriff of London Charity Shield
  Soviet Super Cup (also known as the Season's Cup)
  Yugoslav Super Cup
  Northern Cypriot Super Cup

Cross-border super cups
   Czechoslovak Supercup (cup winners)
   Champions Cup (league champions)
    Campeones Cup (league champions)
   Saudi-Egyptian Super Cup (league champions vs. cup champions)

Continental super cups
Some continental football federations also have their own super cups:
  AFC: Asian Super Cup (defunct)
  CAF: CAF Super Cup
  CONMEBOL: Recopa Sudamericana
  UEFA: UEFA Super Cup

Intercontinental super cups
Most of the continental football confederations have jointly held a competition pitting their champions against each other:

  CONMEBOL & UEFA: Intercontinental Cup
  CONCACAF & CONMEBOL: Copa Interamericana
  AFC & CAF: Afro-Asian Club Championship

All of these competitions are now defunct and have been succeeded by the FIFA Club World Cup, which features the champions of all of the confederations, plus the champion of the host country. In 2017, FIFA retroactively recognised the winners of the European/South American Cup as world champions.

A similar tournament was held at international level, the FIFA Confederations Cup. It was initially held on a biennial basis, every odd year, from 1993 until 2005 when it became quadrennial, the year before a World Cup in its host country. It featured the six continental champions, the World Cup winners and the host. The 2017 FIFA Confederations Cup was the 10th and last Confederations Cup before FIFA abolished it for an expanded Club World Cup. CONMEBOL and UEFA relaunched the CONMEBOL-UEFA Cup of Champions in 2020, previously held as the European/South American Nations Cup in 1985 and 1993, to be contested between the champions of both confederations. 

Other tournaments like this have been held, including the Suruga Bank Championship (pitting the Copa Sudamericana and J.League Cup winners), the Copa de Oro (pitting all the most recent CONMEBOL competition winners), and the Copa Iberoamericana (pitting the Copa de Oro and Copa del Rey winners.

Basketball

National Supercups
  Algeria Basketball Supercup
  Austrian Supercup
  Belgian Supercup
  Dutch Supercup
  French Match des Champions
  German BBL Champions Cup
  Greek Super Cup
  Israeli Supercup
  Italian Supercup
  Jordan Basketball Supercup
  Polish Supercup
  Portuguese SuperCup
  Romanian Supercup
  Slovenian Supercup
  Spanish Supercup
  Turkish Presidential Cup

Regional
 & 
 BNXT Supercup (Belgium & the Netherlands)

Adriatic Supercup (former Yugoslavia)

Continental level
FIBA Europe SuperCup Women: contested between the winners of EuroLeague Women and EuroCup Women.

Water polo

National super cups
  Supercopa de España de Waterpolo: an annual men's water polo match contested between the winners of División de Honor de Waterpolo and Copa del Rey de Waterpolo.
  Supercopa de España de Waterpolo Femenino: an annual women's water polo match contested between the winners of División de Honor Femenina de Waterpolo and Copa de la Reina de Waterpolo.

Continental super cups
  Men's LEN Super Cup: an annual water polo match organized by LEN (European Swimming League) and contested by the reigning champions of the two European club competitions, the LEN Champions League and the LEN Euro Cup.
  Women's LEN Super Cup: an annual water polo match organized by the LEN (European Swimming League) and contested by the reigning champions of the two European club competitions, the LEN Euro League and the LEN Trophy.

Motorsports
The ADAC Supercup, commonly known as Supercup; a German sportscar racing series held between 1985 and 1989.
Ginetta GT Supercup, a British 2-class 1-make sports car racing series
Porsche Supercup, an international one-make racing series for Porsche 911 Carreras

Other sports
IIHF Super Cup, a defunct ice hockey competition.
The Super Powers Cup was an annual international rugby union competition contested by national teams from Canada, Japan, Russia and United States. In 2005, its name was changed to the Super Cup.

See also
 Super League (disambiguation)
 Superbowl (disambiguation)

References

Association football terminology
  
Water polo terminology